The Minnesota Senate, District 4, includes most of Becker and Claycounties in the northwestern part of the state. It is currently represented by Rob Kupec of the DFL .

List of senators

References 

Minnesota Senate districts
Becker County, Minnesota
Clay County, Minnesota
Norman County, Minnesota